UHCC may refer to:

University of Houston, a university in the United States
Upper Hutt City Council, a city council in New Zealand